Maxim Valerievich Shcheogolev (born 20 April 1982) is a popular Russian theatre and film actor, best known for roles in criminal and romantic movies and serials like Karpov (2012), The Second Breath (2008), which earned him a Russian Army "Fighters' Brotherhood" Medal, and The Lone Wolf, 2012. In 2011 he received the Golden Rhino Award for the Best male supporting role in the film Marriage at Will (2011).

Biography
Maxim Shchyogolev was born in Voronezh, to Valery Konstantinovich Shchyogolev, a Soviet Army officer, and Irina Alexandrovna, a doctor. He excelled at school and after the graduation joined the Drama faculty of the Voronezh State Academy of Arts. Here, as a first year student, he was noticed by the Moscow Luna Theatre's director Sergey Prokhanov who invited him to join his own troupe and transferred him to his own class in Russian Academy of Theatre Arts. In 2003, after the graduation, Shchyogolev joined the Moscow Art Theatre's Anatoly Vasilyev-led Drama Art studio, to study there under the supervision of the guest directors, Jerzy Grotowski and Thomas Richards.

Career
In 2001-2005 Shchyogolev was cast in several small (mostly, villainous) parts in films. Then came the 150-series long TV criminal drama The Young and the Angry (2006) where he starred in the leading part of Demidov. It was followed by the Second Breath (2008), for which he received the Fighters Brotherhood medal. Several more serials, including One Day (2008), Girl Hunters (2011), I Will Come Myself (2012) and The Lone Wolf (2013), further cemented his reputation of one of the leading Russian actors of his generation.

Private life
In the early 2000s Maxim Shchyogolev had the relationship with the actress Tatyana Solntseva; in 2002 their son Ilya was born. Then Shchyogolev married the actress Alla Kazakova; they have two daughters, Maria (b. 2007) and Ekaterina (b. 2008).

Selected filmography
2001 - Under the North Star
2002 - Shoemaker
2004-2013 - Kulagin and Partners
2004 - Moscow Saga
2006 - Night express (Short) as He 
2006 - The First Circle (miniseries) as torturer, episode
2006 - Soldiers 6
2006 - Who's the Boss? (TV Series) as Andrey
2006 - The Young and the Angry as Aleksandr Demidov
2007 - The Moon Theatre, or Space fool 13.28
2008 - One Day as Aleksey
2008 - Second Breath as Yuriy Yulev / "Elephant"
2009-2010 - Carmelita. Gypsy passion (TV Series) as Stanislav Zhdanov
2009 - City attractions (TV Series) as Roman Parov 
2009 - Barvikha (TV Series) as bartender
2009 - Everything you need - it's love (TV Series) as Denis
2010 - Lawyer 7 (TV Series) as Krasilnikov
2010 - Marriage as a bequest as Andrey Tikhomirov
2011 - Declared wanted list (TV Series) as Petr Volgin
2011 - Bombila (TV Series) as Ignat
2011 - Hiromant 2 (TV series) as Roman Belkin
2011 - Girl Hunters (TV series) as Georgiy Volkov, General Director
2011 - Secrets of Palace Revolutions as chanter Alexei Razumovsky
2012 - Sklifosovsky (TV series) as Anton
2012 - I Will Come Myself (TV series) as Oleg
2012 - Karpov (TV Series) as Vadim Melnikov
2012 - The Lone Wolf (2 (TV series) as Maksim Dobrynin "Wolf"
2013 - Puppeteers (Mini-series) as Aleksandr, owner of the club
2014 - Anton (Short) as Brother 
2014 - The cops 2 (TV series) as Yuriy Zozulya, Captain CID
2015 - Sword (TV series) as Roman Vinnikov
2015 - Molodezhka (TV Series) as Aleksandr Tochilin, head coach of "Titana"

References

External links
 Official Site
 

1982 births
People from Voronezh
Living people
Russian male television actors
Russian male film actors
Russian male stage actors
21st-century Russian male actors
Russian Academy of Theatre Arts alumni